The Liberal Social Party (PSL) was a political party in Algeria.

History
The PSL ran in the first multi-party elections since independence in 1991, receiving just 0.1% of the vote and failing to win a seat. The 1997 elections saw the party increase its vote share to 0.4%, winning a single seat in the People's National Assembly. However, the party was banned in 1998 after a court rules that it had broken electoral laws.

References

1998 disestablishments in Algeria
Banned political parties in Algeria
Defunct political parties in Algeria
Liberal parties in Algeria
Political parties disestablished in 1998
Defunct liberal political parties
Political parties with year of establishment missing